Nicolae Filipescu (December 5, 1862 – September 30, 1916) was a Romanian politician.

Filipescu was the mayor of Bucharest between February 1893 and October 1895. It was during his term the first electric tramways circulated in Bucharest.

Between December 29, 1910 and March 27, 1912 Filipescu was the Minister of War of Romania, in the Cabinet led by Petre P. Carp.

Biography 
He attended the primary school in the Capital, after which he completed graduated from the high school in Geneva and law school in Paris. Coming back to the country, he started to work politically and joined the young conservatives grouped around the newspaper "Epoca". In 1885 he became an MP for the first time in the Brăila constituency. On February 9, 1893, he was elected the mayor of Bucharest, a position that he held for almost two years, until 1895, when he became the mayor of Brăila.

In 1899 the Conservatives returned to power and Filipescu was re-elected as MP. When the liberal council of the capital was dissolved, he was appointed the chairman of the Interim Commission. In 1898 he killed in a duel the journalist G. Em. Lahovari, the editor of the liberal newspaper "L'independance Roumaine" with which he had had a violent dispute. 

Between July 7, 1900 and February 14, 1901, he was for the first time the Minister of Domains and Agriculture in the government of P.P. Carp. Then he was Minister of War between December 29, 1910 - March 28, 1912 and of Domains between October 14, 1912 - April 5, 1913. 

In 1914 he founded the National Action, the antantophilic wing of the Conservative Party, with people from several parties. In 1916 the National Action led by Filipescu, merged with P.C.D. 

Nicolae Filipescu died on September 30, 1916 after the heart attack.

Appellant of the National Bank 
Nicolae Filipescu asserted himself throughout his political career and as a fierce opponent of the National Bank, of the iniquities that, in his opinion, took place at this very important and prestigious institution of the modern Romanian state. He wanted at all costs the expropriation of the National Bank, ie the abolition of the contract between the state and the National Bank, he proposed to create a central cash department from which the small bank could borrow money, and the central cash department of the National Bank to borrow without interest 30 000 000 lei, merchants and small industrialists and craftsmen managed to pay interest of 6% and not 12%, 15% or 18% as they paid at the time.

Fighter for the national ideal 
The most important period in Nicolae Filipescu's life was the outbreak of the First World War and the entry of Romania, he carried out an extensive activity to achieve the "national ideal". His numerous actions were aimed at convincing the government of Ion I.C. Brătianu for the fact that Romania had to go to war on the side of the Entente, in order to unite all the territories inhabited by Romanians.

After numerous mobilizing actions and speeches in many of the cities of the Old Kingdom and even a visit to the court of Tsar Nicholas II of Russia, to negotiate Romania's entry into the war on the part of the Entente, he saw his work rewarded by the decision taken in The Crown Council of Cotroceni on August 14, 1916, when it was present, and which decided Romania's entry into the war.

References

External links

 

1862 births
1916 deaths
Politicians from Bucharest
Conservative Party (Romania, 1880–1918) politicians
Romanian Ministers of Defence
Romanian Ministers of Agriculture
Mayors of Bucharest